Sara Brogiato (born 19 March 1990) is an Italian female long-distance runner who competed at individual senior level at the IAAF World Half Marathon Championships.

National titles
She won a national championships at individual senior level.
Italian Athletics Championships
Half marathon: 2017

References

External links
 

1990 births
Living people
Italian female long-distance runners
Athletics competitors of Centro Sportivo Aeronautica Militare